CCGS Simcoe was a Canadian Coast Guard buoy tender and light icebreaker. The second vessel of the name in Canadian government service, Simcoe was in service from 1962 to 2007 based out of the Coast Guard base at Prescott, Ontario working the Great Lakes and Saint Lawrence Seaway. In 2008 the ship was sold to commercial interests.

Design and description
Simcoe was propelled by a two fixed-pitch propellers driven by a diesel-electric system (DC/DC) comprising two Paxman 4SA 12-cylinder diesel engines driving two motors creating . The vessel had a complement of 27, composed of 10 officers and 17 crew.

Service history

The ship was constructed by Canadian Vickers at their shipyard in Montreal, Quebec with the yard number 279.   The second Canadian government ship named for John Graves Simcoe, the first Lieutenant-Governor of Upper Canada, the ship entered service in November 1962. The vessel was registered in Ottawa, Ontario, but was homeported at Prescott, Ontario in the Central Region for use on the Great Lakes and St. Lawrence Seaway.

Simcoe underwent modernisation in 1988. Remaining operational for 45 years, Simcoe was decommissioned and renamed 2007-01 in 2008. The vessel was sold in June 2008 to Sheridan Platinum Group Ltd, of Ontario.

References

Notes

Citations

Sources

External links

Navaids tenders of the Canadian Coast Guard
1962 ships
Ships built in Quebec
Ships of the Canadian Coast Guard